Feather pillow dermatitis is a rash caused by bites of the mite Dermatophagoides scheremetewskyi.

See also 
 List of cutaneous conditions
 List of mites associated with cutaneous reactions

References

Parasitic infestations, stings, and bites of the skin